Dil Apna Punjabi (English: Our Heart is Punjabi) is a Punjabi feature film. It was released on 3 September 2006. It stars Harbhajan Mann, Neeru Bajwa and Dara Singh. The film was produced by Kumar S. Taurani and Ramesh S. Taurani, written and directed by Manmohan Singh.

Synopsis 
Set in the lively village of modern-day Punjab, "Dil Apna Punjabi", is about a family spanning over four generations all living under one roof headed by Sardar Hardam Singh (Dara Singh).

His grandson, Kanwal (Harbhajan Mann) is a man of his heart, who spends most of his time with his friends; a village musical troupe. When Kanwal when meets college friend Ladi (Neeru Bajwa) at relative Faujan's (Amar Noorie) home he falls in love. Faujan makes their love match seem as an arranged marriage to their respective families. However, Ladi's family meet him, they are discouraged due to his unambitious approach and his lack of employment.

When a talent scout (Gurpreet Ghuggi) hears him singing, Kanwal decides to make a success of himself in the UK to prove himself. Here he meets TV host Lisa (Mahek Chahal). Lisa is drawn towards Kanwal's charm and simplicity soon begins to have feelings for Kanwal.

Kanwal has to choose between fame and fortune with Lisa in the UK, or returning to his roots in the Punjab to be with his first love Ladi.

Cast
Harbhajan Mann ... Kanwal
Neeru Bajwa ... Ladi
Mahek Chahal ... Lisa
Gurpreet Ghuggi ... Mundi Singh
Dara Singh ... S. Hardam Singh
Kanwaljit Singh ... Kang Singh
Deep Dhillon ... Gurtej Singh (Sarpanchi)
Satwant Kaur
Amar Noorie ... Amro
Rana Ranbir ... Lakkad Chab
Apache Indian ... Special Appearance

Music 
The music is by Sukhshinder Shinda and a blend of bhangra and Punjabi hip hop, and also includes Apache Indian. The songs of the movie are sung by Harbhajan Mann, Alka Yagnik and Sunidhi Chauhan.

Locations 
The film is picturised in scenic locales of Kullu Manali, Chandigarh, Punjab and various locations like Tower Bridge, St. Paul's Cathedral, Windsor Castle, Battersea Park, Margate Beach, Caversham Bridge in London, UK.

References

External links 
 Apna Punjab Official Website
 Dil Apna Punjabi Official Website
 Dil Apna Punjabi at IMDb

2006 films
Punjabi-language Indian films
2000s Punjabi-language films
Films set in Punjab, India
Films set in London
Films shot in Chandigarh
Films shot in London
Films shot in Himachal Pradesh